Vasile Jardan (born 20 July 1993) is a Moldovan footballer who plays as a defender for Romanian Liga II side Oțelul Galați. In his career, Jardan also played for teams such as Dacia Chișinău, Academia Chișinău or Milsami Orhei, among others.

Club statistics
Total matches played in Moldavian First League: 4 matches - 0 goals

Honours
Oțelul Galați
Liga III: 2021–22

References

External links

Profile at Divizia Nationala

1993 births
Living people
Moldovan footballers
Association football defenders
Footballers from Chișinău
Moldova youth international footballers
Moldova under-21 international footballers
Moldovan Super Liga players
FC Dacia Chișinău players
FC Academia Chișinău players
FC Dinamo-Auto Tiraspol players
FC Milsami Orhei players
Liga III players
ASC Oțelul Galați players
Moldovan expatriate footballers
Moldovan expatriate sportspeople in Romania
Expatriate footballers in Romania